Corran is a hamlet on the northern shore of Loch Hourn, in Lochalsh in Inverness-shire in the Highlands of Scotland. It is situated at the foot of Glen Arnisdale, where the River Arnisdale flows past into Loch Hourn.

Corran is at the end of a minor road, about 1 km past the village of Arnisdale. A footpath continues to Kinloch Hourn.

References

Populated places in Lochalsh